The Women's team sprint competition at the 2017 World Championships was held on 12 April 2017.

Results

Qualifying
The fastest 8 teams qualified for the first round.

 Q = qualified

First round
First round heats were held as follows:
Heat 1: 4th v 5th fastest
Heat 2: 3rd v 6th fastest
Heat 3: 2nd v 7th fastest
Heat 4: 1st v 8th fastest

The heat winners were ranked on time, from which the top 2 proceeded to the gold medal final and the other 2 proceeded to the bronze medal final.

 QG = qualified for gold medal final
 QB = qualified for bronze medal final

Finals
The final classification was decided in the medal finals.

References

Women's team sprint
UCI Track Cycling World Championships – Women's team sprint